Fighter Pilot: Operation Red Flag is an IMAX film centered on the experiences of a USAF F-15 Eagle fighter pilot, then-Captain John Stratton, who wants to be professionally successful as a fighter pilot. It chronicles his experience during USAF Red Flag training at Nellis AFB, a simulated air war designed to train pilots for combat. Directed by Stephen Low and presented by Boeing, the film shows how airmen simulate a war without killing one another, as well as the training of military air base firemen, military ordnance crews, midair refueling operations, cockpit views, and other aspects of aerial combat. The film was released in December 2004.

War simulation
The exercise simulates an air war without firing actual weapons using NACTS (Nellis Air Combat Training System). The participating aircraft, carrying specialized telemetry pods or other equipment, send back telemetry information to computer, and when they have "fired," the computer figures out who is "hit."  Color codes during computer replay debriefs offer a way of telling participants apart, with blue planes representing friendly forces and red planes representing enemy forces in the exercise.

Reception
Fighter Pilot was met with mixed reviews. Robert Koehler of Variety gave the film an unfavorable review, saying, "Presumably, the greatest strength of an Imax format film about flying would be placing viewers in the cockpit and immersing eyes and ears in the total flight experience. Director Stephen Low is either unable or unwilling to do this." Bruce Westbook of the Houston Chronicle commented on his review that "the crisp military teams are inspiring, showing fierce dedication and camaraderie. Fighter Pilot should set minds at ease that businesslike experts defend our skies. But it plays more like a recruitment film than an eye-popping IMAX experience." The film is currently rated at 56% on Rotten Tomatoes.

References

External links
Official site

2004 films
2004 documentary films
American short documentary films
Documentary films about military aviation
Documentary films about the United States Air Force
Short films directed by Stephen Low
Films set in Nevada
Films shot in Nevada
IMAX short films
IMAX documentary films
2000s English-language films
2000s American films
English-language documentary films